The Great Northern Mall was an enclosed regional shopping mall located in the Syracuse suburb of Clay, New York. The mall is currently under development by Hart Lyman Company which will transform the mall into a lifestyle center with luxury apartments and townhomes, a movie theater and hotel, high-end shops and restaurants.

The mall served Syracuse's northern suburbs and Onondaga County.

Since the center opened in 1988, previous anchors have included The Bon-Ton, Dey Brothers, Chappell's, Macy's, Sibley's, Kaufmann's, Dick's Sporting Goods, and Hess's.

The mall remained a major shopping mall before ultimately transitioning into a lifestyle center  which is currently under development.

The later 2010's saw multiple traditional chain anchors update their brick-and-mortar fleets after being disrupted by digital retailers in recent years.

On January 4, 2017, Macy's, which maintains a much larger outpost at Destiny USA, announced as part of a strategy to focus on their highest achieving locations that they would be leaving the center. 

On June 28, 2018, it was announced Sears would shutter as part of an ongoing plan to phase out of brick-and-mortar.

On July 10, 2021 Dick's Sporting Goods transitioned to a Wegmans-anchored shopping center less than a mile away.

An IHOP opened in front of the mall on March 16, 2021.

On August 17, 2022, the mall announced Hart Lyman Company was transforming the mall into a lifestyle center with luxury apartments and townhomes, a movie theater and hotel, high-end shops and restaurants.

On October 27, 2022, a letter was sent to the remaining tenants informing them the mall closed permanently on November 20, 2022.  Days later on October 30, 2022, Guy Hart, who is acquiring the mall, asked the current owners to not enforce the deadline date giving the remaining tenants at least until the sale of the mall in December to vacate.  However, current owner Mike Kohan has insisted that November 20 is the actual closing date.

References

External links 
Official Site

Defunct shopping malls in the United States
Shopping malls established in 1988
Buildings and structures in Onondaga County, New York
1988 establishments in New York (state)
Kohan Retail Investment Group
Shopping malls disestablished in 2022
2022 disestablishments in New York (state)